Laurie Birks (born 7 January 1928) was an Australian boxer. He competed in the men's featherweight event at the 1948 Summer Olympics.

References

1928 births
Living people
Australian male boxers
Olympic boxers of Australia
Boxers at the 1948 Summer Olympics
Place of birth missing (living people)
Featherweight boxers